Pandanus brosimos, the wild karuka, is a species of tree in the family Pandanaceae, endemic to New Guinea. Along with Pandanus julianettii, it is widely harvested in New Guinea as a traditional food source. Many local ethnic groups make use of pandanus languages (a special avoidance language) when harvesting the nuts.

It was first formally described by Elmer Drew Merrill and Lily May Perry in 1940.

References

brosimos
Trees of New Guinea
Edible nuts and seeds
Fruits originating in Asia
Tropical fruit
Tropical agriculture
Non-timber forest products
Endemic flora of New Guinea
Taxa named by Elmer Drew Merrill
Taxa named by Lily May Perry